Park Hae-Jung (Hangul: 박해정, Hanja:  朴海晶) (born July 29, 1972 in Iksan, Jeollabuk-do, South Korea) is a former female table tennis player from South Korea.

Park is currently serving as a television table tennis commentator, running her own table tennis academy in Ilsan, South Korea.

External links
profile

1972 births
Living people
South Korean female table tennis players
Table tennis players at the 1996 Summer Olympics
Olympic table tennis players of South Korea
Olympic bronze medalists for South Korea
Olympic medalists in table tennis
Asian Games medalists in table tennis
Table tennis players at the 1994 Asian Games
Table tennis players at the 1998 Asian Games
Asian Games bronze medalists for South Korea
Medalists at the 1994 Asian Games
Medalists at the 1998 Asian Games
Medalists at the 1996 Summer Olympics
People from Iksan
Sportspeople from North Jeolla Province